The smallmouth spiny eel (Polyacanthonotus rissoanus), also called the shortspine tapirfish, is a species of deep-sea spiny eel.

Description

It has 26–36 dorsal soft rays. It looks similar to Polyacanthonotus africanus but its lateral line is lighter and less distinct. It has a small mouth and a short preoral snout. Mature males are distinguished by their black nostrils.

Habitat

The smallmouth spiny eel lives in the Arctic waters off of Canada and in the North Atlantic Ocean off of Iceland, Ireland and Great Britain; it has also been observed in the waters off South Africa and in the Tasman Sea.

Behaviour

Polyacanthonotus rissoanus feeds on coelenterates, worms and crustaceans.

References

Notacanthidae
Fish described in 1857
Taxa named by Filippo De Filippi
Taxa named by Jean Baptiste Vérany